Governor Johnson may refer to:

Andrew Johnson (1808–1875), Governor of Tennessee, and later Military Governor of Tennessee
David Johnson (governor) (1782–1855), Governor of South Carolina
Edwin C. Johnson (1884–1970), Governor of Colorado
Gary Johnson (born 1953), Governor of New Mexico
George W. Johnson (governor) (1811–1862), Governor of Kentucky
Henry Johnson (Louisiana politician) (1783–1864), Governor of Louisiana
Herschel Vespasian Johnson (1812–1880), Governor of Georgia
Hiram Johnson (1866–1945), Governor of California
Isaac Johnson (1803–1853), Governor of Louisiana
J. Neely Johnson (1825–1872), Governor of California
James Johnson (Georgia) (1811–1891), Governor of Georgia
John Albert Johnson (1861–1909), Governor of Minnesota
Jonathan G. A. Johnson (born 1976), Island Governor of Saba since 2008
Joseph Johnson (Virginia politician) (1785–1877), Governor of Virginia
Joseph B. Johnson (1893–1986), Governor of Vermont
Keen Johnson (1896–1970), Governor of Kentucky
Nathaniel Johnson (politician) (1644–1713), Governor of the Leeward Islands in 1686 and Governor of the Province of Carolina from 1703 to 1709
Paul B. Johnson Jr. (1916–1985), Governor of Mississippi, son of Paul B. Johnson Sr.
Paul B. Johnson Sr. (1880–1943), Governor of Mississippi
Robert Johnson (governor) (1682–1735), Colonial Governor of the Province of South Carolina from 1717 to 1719 and from 1729 to 1735
Thomas Johnson (jurist) (1732–1819), Governor of Maryland
Walter Walford Johnson (1904–1987), Governor of Colorado